Myat Kaung Khant (born 15 July 2000) is a Burmese professional footballer who plays as a midfielder for Myanmar national football team and Chainat Hornbill F.C.

Myat Kaung Khant was a talented home grown player of Myanmar Football Academy. In 2017, Yadanarbon signed Myat Kaung Khant with a transfer fee of 5,000,000 MMK. He officially made his debut in 2018 at the age of 17 and since then, he had been part of the senior squad. He scored his first ever professional goal in his debut game. After spending 2 years in Myanmar National League, he earned a move to Chainat Hornbill in Thai League 2.

Club career

Myat Kaung Khant made his first professional goal against Ayeyawady United F.C. on 8 April 2018.

International career

Under-19
Myat Kaung Khant made his debut for the Myanmar under-19 team in 2018. He scored three out of 6 goals against the Philippines at the Phnom Penh Olympic Stadium in Cambodia.

Senior
He made his debut on 10 October 2018 against Indonesia in a friendly match and scored his first international goal for the Myanmar national team against Bahrain.

International

International goals
Scores and results list Myanmar's goal tally first.

Honours
Shan United
Myanmar National League (1):  2022

References

2000 births
Living people
People from Ayeyarwady Region
Yadanarbon F.C. players
Association football midfielders
Footballers at the 2018 Asian Games
Burmese footballers
Asian Games competitors for Myanmar
Competitors at the 2019 Southeast Asian Games
Southeast Asian Games medalists in football
Southeast Asian Games bronze medalists for Myanmar
Competitors at the 2021 Southeast Asian Games